Thiede is a surname. Notable people with the surname include:

Carsten Peter Thiede (1952–2004), German archaeologist and New Testament scholar
Fritz Thiede (1896–1981), German World War I flying ace
Marco Thiede (born 1992), German footballer
Niclas Thiede (born 1999), German footballer 
Norbert Thiede (born 1949), East German former Olympic discus thrower
Oskar Thiede (1879–1961), Austrian sculptor
Paula Thiede (1870–1919), German trade unions leader
Peter Thiede (born 1968), German rowing cox
Volkmar Thiede (born 1948), East German sprint canoeist